Benthophilus ragimovi is a deepwater species of gobiid fish found along the western coasts of the Caspian Sea, from the Chechen Island to Astara, Azerbaijan. It is one of the numerous species of benthophiline gobies endemic to the Ponto-Caspian region (Caspian and Black Sea basins).

References

Fish of the Caspian Sea
Fish of Western Asia
Benthophilus
Endemic fauna of the Caspian Sea
Fish described in 2004